Metaeuchromius changensis is a moth in the family Crambidae. It was described by Schouten in 1997. It is found in China (Hubei).

References

Crambinae
Moths described in 1997